In contemporary societies, the appropriateness of children being nude in various social situations is controvercial, with many differences in behavior worldwide. Depending upon conceptions of childhood innocence and sexuality in general, societies may regard social nudity before puberty as normal, as acceptable within same sex groups, or unacceptable. Contemporary attitudes have been shifting in response to perception of the threat of child abuse and exploitation, while others maintain the need for openness and freedom for healthy child development. Some Northern European and non-Western Indigenous societies maintain this openness, such as allowing children to play outdoors nude.

History 

Any sense of shock at seeing naked children is a recent phenomenon in Western societies. Despite the prudery of the Victorian era, children being unclothed was accepted as natural and ordinary in many circumstances. Children were often free to run about naked in the nursery, and in Britain children of the royal family were photographed nude in the 1920s and 1930s. Images of nude children appeared in soap ads and fine art. 

In 1909, the New York Times reported that at an elementary school swimming competition the youngest boys competed nude after finding that suits slowed them down. Boys had been skinny-dipping in open water for generations, which only became a problem when urbanization brought this activity more often into public view.  Suits had not been allowed in male-only swim classes in indoor pools from the 1880s, to maintain the cleanliness of water. In many places in the United States, boys swam nude until the 1970s, when school swimming pools became mixed-gender. 

As recently as 1996 the YMCA maintained a policy of allowing very young children to accompany their parents into the locker room of the opposite gender, which some health care professionals questioned. A contemporary solution has been to provide separate family changing rooms.

Indigenous nudity 
Until 20,000 years ago, all humans were hunter-gatherers living in close contact with their natural surroundings. In addition to sharing a way of life, they were naked much of the time. In tropical parts of Africa, the Americas, Asia, and Oceania everyday nudity began to change only hundreds of years ago, and remains true for the remaining Indigenous peoples with little or no contact with outsiders. In many pastoral societies in warmer climates adult may be minimally clothed or naked while working, children would  be nude.

In contemporary rural villages of Sub-Saharan Africa, both boys and girls are allowed to play totally nude, and women bare their breasts in the belief that the meaning of naked bodies is not limited to sexuality. In Lagos, Nigeria, some parents continue to allow children to be naked until puberty. There is now an issue with strangers taking photographs, and they worry about pedophiles, but parents want kids to have the same freedom they remember from their own childhood and grow up with a positive body image.

Stages of human development
A report issued in 2009 on child sexual development in the United States by the National Child Traumatic Stress Network asserted that children have a natural curiosity about their own bodies and the bodies of others. The report recommended that parents learn what is normal in regard to nudity and sexuality at each stage of a child's development and refrain from overreacting to their children's nudity-related behaviors unless there are signs of a problem (e.g. anxiety, aggression, or sexual interactions between children not of the same age or stage of development). The general advice for caregivers is to find ways of setting boundaries without giving the child a sense of shame. Parents and caregivers need to understand that a child's explorations of their own and others bodies are motivated by curiosity, not anything similar to adult sexuality.

Early childhood 
Sexual awareness begins in infancy, and develops along with physical and cognitive abilities. Preschool children have little sense of modesty, and will seek bodily comfort by removing their clothes and touching themselves. They are curious about the difference between boys and girls, and learn mainly by sight and touch; wanting to see and touch the bodies of others their own age. They usually learn the difference between boys and girls, including themselves, by the age of 3 or 4. They have little understanding of the effects of their behavior on others. As their language use grows, they will use words they have heard (either euphemistic or accurate) for body parts and functions. At age four to six they will ask questions about bodily functions, attempt to see other people when they are naked, and explore the bodies of others their own age.

Normal sexual play includes behaviors such as playing doctor, playing house, imitating intercourse clothed, looking at or briefly touching other children's genitals, sexual talk and jokes, sexual games, and masturbation. Normal sexual behavior is exploratory and spontaneous, not accompanied by strong feelings of anger, fear, or anxiety. These behaviors occur occasionally between peers or siblings who are of similar age, size, and level of development. Caregivers must determine when behavior becomes problematic and requires intervention. In some families any sexual behavior, such as masturbation, may be seen as problematic or unacceptable, even though the behavior is generally viewed as normal by professionals.

School-Age children 
Between the age of 7 and 12 children generally develop a sense of privacy. Puberty begin at about age 10, with many bodily changes including growth spurts. There may be social difficulties depending upon individual differences in sexual development of children the same age. Knowledge of these changes depend upon correct information and educational materials being provided. Parents may be uncomfortable providing such information, and their children may turn to inaccurate information and values contained in movies, television, and the internet.

Pre-pubescent children tend to have friends of the same sex. They may participate in sex play that is motivated by curiosity, and does not reflect upon sexual orientation. Parents may respond to such behavior by providing age-appropriate guidance regarding social rules.

Late adolescence 
Puberty ends at about 15 or 16, while cognitive development continues until legal adulthood, usually at 18.

Behaviors between adolescents of the same age are generally considered normal if it does not involve coercion or sexual motivation. Otherwise, appropriateness of sexual behavior depends upon family and cultural traditions regarding physical expression of affection, privacy accorded to children, and openness about sexuality.

Nudity in the home 
The degree of personal privacy now considered normal developed only recently, families in the Medieval period often slept naked in a communal room. 

American writer Bonny Rough lived in Amsterdam and the US while raising her children, and learned that Dutch families typically experienced mixed gender family nudity growing up. In the US, children are not likely to have similar experiences; family nudity typically being nonexistent or gender-segregated. Americans avoid talking about the body and sex with their children, in particular not using real or specific names for body parts and functions. Yet giving children correct vocabulary is part of teaching them how to accurately report if they are touched inappropriately. Also, the basic vocabulary is the starting point for a lifetime of sex ed, which cannot wait until adolescence to be learned thoroughly. This is made more difficult since most American parents did not learn these things growing up, so they cannot be role models for appropriate behavior. In the Netherlands, sexual education begins at age 4, but in many US communities, early childhood sex ed is thought to be inappropriate.

Parent-child nudity

In 1995, Gordon and Schroeder contended that "there is nothing inherently wrong with bathing with children or otherwise appearing naked in front of them", noting that doing so may provide an opportunity for parents to provide important information. They noted that by ages five to six, children begin to develop a sense of modesty, and recommended to parents who desire to be sensitive to their children's wishes that they respect a child's modesty from that age onwards. In a 1995 review of the literature, Paul Okami concluded that there was no reliable evidence linking exposure to parental nudity to any negative effect. Three years later, his team finished an 18-year longitudinal study that showed, if anything, such exposure was associated with slight beneficial effects, particularly for boys. In 1999, psychologist Barbara Bonner recommended against nudity in the home if children exhibit sexual play of a type that is considered problematic. In 2019, psychiatrist Lea Lis recommended that parents allow nudity as a natural part of family life when children are very young, but to respect the modesty that is likely to emerge with puberty.

In Northern European countries, family nudity is normal, which teaches from an early age that nakedness need not be sexual. Bodily modesty is not part of the Finnish identity due to the universal use of the sauna, a historical tradition that has been maintained. In contemporary Japan, parents and children continue to bathe together thought adolescence without regard to gender.

Communal nudity
In their 1986 study on the effects of social nudity on children, Smith and Sparks concluded that "the viewing of the unclothed body, far from being destructive to the psyche, seems to be either benign or to actually provide positive benefits to the individuals involved".

The naturist/nudist point of view is that children are "nudists at heart" and that naturism provides the ideal environment for healthy development. It is noted that modern psychology generally agrees that children can benefit from an open environment where the bodies of others their own age of both sexes are not a mystery. However, there is less agreement regarding children and adults being nude. While some doctors have taken the view that some exposure of children to adult nudity (particularly parental nudity) may be healthy, others—notably Benjamin Spock—disagreed. Spock's view was later attributed to the lingering effect of Freudianism on the medical profession.

Peer group nudity 
Societies have various norms regarding children of similar age being nude together when needed, such as changing clothes or bathing. When very young, this may be in mixed gender groups; with gender segregation beginning at or before puberty. Different norms may apply to girls, on the assumption that they are more modest.

In a 2009 article for the New York Times "Home" section, Julie Scelfo interviewed parents regarding the nudity of small children at home in situations which might include visitors outside the immediate household. The situations ranged from a three-year-old being naked at a large gathering to the use of a backyard swim pool becoming an issue when the children of disapproving neighbors participated. While the consensus was to allow kids to be kids up to the age of five, there was acknowledgment of the possible discomfort of adults who consider such behavior to be inappropriate. While opponents of child nudity referred to the danger of pedophilia, proponents viewed innocent nudity as beneficial compared to the sexualization of children in toddler beauty pageants with makeup and "sexy" outfits.

Daycare and schools 

The normal behavior of very young children may become an issue outside the home. Daycare in Denmark had traditionally been tolerant of nudity and sexuality among preschool children until the beginning of this century, but differences of opinion have arisen with the possibility that not only caregivers but other children being accused of inappropriate behavior or abuse. 

By the 1990s, communal showers in American schools had become "uncomfortable", not only because students were accustomed to more privacy at home, but because young people became more self-conscious based upon the comparison to mass media images of perfect bodies. The trend for privacy is being extended to public schools, colleges and community facilities replacing "gang showers" and open locker rooms with individual stalls and changing rooms. A 2014 study of schools in England found that 53% of boys and 67.5% of girls did not shower after physical education (PE) classes. Other studies indicate that not showering, while often related to being naked with peers, is also related to lower intensity of physical activity and involvement in sports.

The change in privacy also addresses issues of transgender usage and family use when one parent accompanies children of differing gender.

A shift in attitudes has come to societies historically open to nudity. In the Netherlands until the 1980s children up to age 12 used mixed gender communal showers at school. In the 2000s, some shower in a bathing suit. In Denmark, secondary school students are now avoiding showering after gym classes. In interviews, students cited the lack of privacy, fears of being judged by idealized standards, and the possibility of being photographed while naked. Similar results were found in schools in Norway.

Sex education 

In a 2018 survey of predominantly white middle-class college students in the United States, only 9.98% of women and 7.04% of men reported seeing real people (either adults or other children) as their first childhood experience of nudity. Many were accidental (walking in on someone) and were more likely to be remembered as negative by women. Only 4.72% of women and 2% of men reported seeing nude images as part of sex education. A majority of both women (83.59%) and men (89.45%) reported that their first image of nudity was in film, video, or other mass media.

In general, the United States remains uniquely puritanical in its moral judgements compared to other Western, developed nations. As of 2015, 37 U.S. states required that sex education curricula include lessons on abstinence and 25 required that a "just say no" approach be stressed. Studies show that early and complete sex education does not increase the likelihood of becoming sexually active, but leads to better health outcomes overall. 

The health textbooks in Finnish secondary schools emphasize the normalcy of non-sexual nudity in saunas and gyms as well as openness to the appropriate expression of developing sexuality. The Netherlands also has open and comprehensive sex education beginning as early as age 4. In addition to good health outcomes, the program promoted gender equality. Young children in the Netherlands often play outdoors or in public wading pools nude. This continues, although parents must now be more vigilant of strangers taking pictures. Dutch illustrated books depict naked bodies when appropriate.

Tous à Poil! (Everybody Gets Naked!), a French picture book for children, was first published in 2011 with the stated purpose of presenting a view of nudity in opposition to media images of the ideal body but instead depicting ordinary people swimming naked in the sea including a teacher and a policeman. Attempts by the Union for a Popular Movement to exclude the book from schools prompted French booksellers and librarians to hold a nude protest in support of the book's viewpoint. 

As part of a science program on Norwegian public television (NRK), a series on puberty intended for 8–12-year-olds includes explicit information and images of reproduction, anatomy, and the changes that are normal with the approach of puberty. Rather than diagrams or photos, the videos were shot in a locker room with live nude people of all ages. The presenter, a physician, is relaxed about close examination and touching of relevant body parts, including genitals. While the videos note that the age of consent in Norway is 16, abstinence is not emphasized. In a subsequent series for teens and young adults, real people were recruited to have sex on TV as counterbalance to the unrealistic presentations in advertising and porn. A 2020 episode of a Danish TV show for children presented five nude adults to an audience of 11–13-year-olds with the lesson "normal bodies look like this" to counter social media images of perfect bodies.

A 2009 report issued by the CDC comparing the sexual health of teens in France, Germany, the Netherlands and the United States concluded that if the US implemented comprehensive sex education similar to the three European countries there would be a significant reduction in teen pregnancies, abortions and the rate of sexually transmitted diseases, and save hundreds of millions of dollars.

Depictions 

Until the late 20th century, nudity of children was used in photography, advertisements and film to evoke positive associations of innocence in childhood. For example, the Walt Disney movie Pollyanna in 1960 began with a scene of boys skinny-dipping in a river that was consistent at that time with the carefree nature of the story of small-town America. 

For decades, proud parents have taken and shared photographs of their infants and young children naked. During the final decades before digital photography, labs processing film photographs might report them to the police as possible evidence of child abuse, with some charges being filed but few sustained. Currently, Facebook policy removes all nude images of children from its website not based on indicating abuse, but the possibility of abuse by others. Under Federal law (18 U.S. Code § 2251) only the depiction of sexually explicit conduct involving any person under 18 is prohibited.

See also
Child sexuality

Citations

Notes 
a."The athletic prowess of the very small boys in the eighty-pound championship was of less moment to the spectators than the enthusiasm of the youngsters, who discovered in their trial heats that their swimming trunks impeded them, and that they could swim faster nude. Thereafter the rule about trunks went into the discard, and very small boys in a state of nature swam like tadpoles through the many heats necessary for a decision." - New York Times, April 18, 1909, page 30.

References

Nudity
Child sexuality